Michael Harrison Watson (born November 7, 1956) is a United States district judge of the United States District Court for the Southern District of Ohio.

Education and career
Watson was born in Akron, Ohio. He received his Bachelor of Arts degree from Ohio State University in 1983 and his Juris Doctor from Capital University Law School in 1987. He was a member of the United States Air Force from 1975 to 1978 and was in the Ohio Air National Guard from 1978 to 1984. He rose to the rank of E5.

Watson was a bailiff/law clerk of the Franklin County Court of Common Pleas from 1983 to 1988. He was in private practice in Ohio from 1988 to 1991 and was chief legal counsel of the Ohio Department of Commerce from 1991 to 1992. He was a deputy chief legal counsel in the Office of the Governor of Ohio from 1992 to 1994 and was chief legal counsel from 1994 to 1995. Watson was a judge to the Franklin County Court of Common Pleas from 1996 to 2003. He was a judge to the Tenth District Ohio Court of Appeal from 2003 to 2004.

Federal judicial service

President George W. Bush nominated Watson to the United States District Court for the Southern District of Ohio on April 6, 2004, to the seat vacated by James L. Graham. Confirmed by the Senate on September 7, 2004, he received commission three days later.

Since 2018, Judge Watson has presiding over the Ohio State University abuse scandal lawsuits, which has stalled in mediation for over 3 years and favored OSU defendants In September 2021, it was revealed that Judge Watson failed to disclose that his wife has a licensing agreement with the university to sell OSU flags; the Judge offered to hear arguments requesting his recusal. Judge Watson is also an adjunct faculty member at OSU, which would typically be a disqualification from presiding over his employer. The plaintiffs and Strauss survivors in these lawsuits are frustrated with the Judge and OSU.

References

Sources

1956 births
Living people
Capital University Law School alumni
Ohio state court judges
Ohio State University alumni
Politicians from Akron, Ohio
Judges of the Ohio District Courts of Appeals
Judges of the United States District Court for the Southern District of Ohio
United States district court judges appointed by George W. Bush
21st-century American judges
United States Air Force non-commissioned officers
Ohio National Guard personnel